Corydoras punctatus (spotted catfish) is a species of catfish found in the Suriname river basin and Iracoubo river basin in tropical Suriname and French Guiana. The species is rarely seen. It is hard to tell the sex of the fish until they are an adult. The species can breed easily. The species eat many foods including shrimp pellets, blood worms, brine shrimp, and pre-soaked flake food. Corydoras punctatus is a social fish.

See also
List of freshwater aquarium fish species

References

Corydoras
Tropical fish
Fish described in 1794